Aslampur is a union territory of Char Fasson Upazila in Bhola district in Bangladesh. It is the second largest union in Char Fasson.

Area
The area of Aslampur Union is 6,284 acres.

Administrative Structure
Aslampur Union is secondth union in order of administrative numbering of all the unions under Char Fasson Upazila. Administrative activities of this union are under Char Fashion Police Station. It is part of Bhola-4 constituency 118 of the National Assembly.

Population Data
According to the 2011 census, the total population of Aslampur Union is 35,684. Of these, 18,631 are males and 18,953 are females. The total number of families is 6,391.

Education
According to the 2011 census, Aslampur Union has an average literacy rate of 53.6%.

Reference

Unions of Char Fasson Upazila
Char Fasson Upazila
Unions of Bhola District

See also
Abubakarpur Union